Die, Monster, Die! (British title: Monster of Terror) is a 1965 science fiction horror film directed by Daniel Haller, and starring Boris Karloff, Nick Adams, Freda Jackson, and Suzan Farmer. Its plot follows an American man who, while visiting his English fiancee's familial estate, uncovers a series of bizarre occurrences. It is a loose adaptation of H. P. Lovecraft's story "The Colour Out of Space".

American International Pictures released the film as a double feature with Mario Bava's Planet of the Vampires (1965).

Plot
Stephen Reinhart, an American scientist, travels to Arkham, England to visit his fiancée, Susan Witley, whom he met while she was studying abroad in the United States. He arrives at the Witley estate, where he is met coolly by Susan's father, Nahum. Susan's bedridden mother, Letitia, however, is welcoming of him. She invites Stephen to speak with her, but remains partly hidden by her bed canopy, which obscures her features. She offers Stephen a box containing a gold earring that she says belonged to her maid, Helga, who recently fell mysteriously ill and disappeared.

Over dinner, Stephen asks Susan and Nahum about a blackened patch of land near the estate that appears decimated. They state it was caused by a fire, though Susan adds that no one has been able to fully explain what occurred there. Moments later, the butler, Mervyn, collapses. Later, while Susan brings her mother dinner, she is startled by a cloaked figure that appears in the window. Late that night, Stephen and Susan hear mysterious noises emanating from the basement. When they go to investigate, they are met by Nahum, who nervously informs them that Mervyn has died. Later that night, Stephen witnesses Nahum burying Mervyn's body in the woods. When he follows him outside, he observes a strange light glowing from the greenhouse.

At dawn, Stephen leaves the estate and is followed by a cloaked figure who attacks him in the woods, but the individual quickly flees. Back in the village, Stephen meets with Henderson, the town doctor, who is reluctant to speak to him due to his association with the Witleys. Henderson's secretary informs Stephen that Susan's grandfather, Corbin Witley, died in Henderson's arms, but the circumstances of his death remain a mystery.

Stephen confronts Susan about the goings-on, and the two go to investigate the greenhouse; inside, they discover plants and flowers grown to an abnormally large size. In a potting shed, they discover a machine emitting radiation, along with several large, caged creatures. Stephen finds pieces of meteorite stone that he suspects are also emitting radiation. Susan remarks that both her mother and Helga frequently worked in the greenhouse.

While Stephen goes to investigate in the basement, Susan confronts her father about the discovery they made in the greenhouse, realizing that he has been experimenting with radioactivity to mutate plant and animal life, resulting in dire consequences, such as Letitia and Helga's disfigurements and illnesses. Nahum confronts Stephen in the basement, where he has located a large chamber containing a radioactive meteorite. Upstairs, Stephen, Susan, and Nahum find Letitia's room empty and in disarray. Shortly after, Susan and Stephen are attacked by a grossly-disfigured  Letitia, whose face has decayed significantly.

When burying Letitia in the family cemetery the next day, Nahum explains how he obtained the meteorite: It fell from the sky, landing in the heath near the estate, and triggered a lush growth of plants around it within one day. Nahum intended to use the meteorite to create a foliage-rich landscape. That night, when Nahum attempts to destroy the meteor in the basement, he is attacked by a cloaked, axe-wielding Helga. She attempts to kill him, but accidentally falls to her death in the chamber, landing on the meteorite. Nahum, now highly-exposed to the meteorite, suffers radiation burns that grossly disfigure him. He chases Stephen and Susan through the house before bursting into flames, setting the Witley mansion ablaze, with Stephen and Susan narrowly escaping to safety.

Cast

Production
It was shot in February and March 1965 at Shepperton Studios under the working title The House at the End of the World.

Release
In the United States, American International Pictures released the film on 27 October 1965 as the first feature on a double bill with Mario Bava's Planet of the Vampires (1965). In the UK, the film was shown to the film trade on 4 February 1966 and released on the 20th the same month, supported by Roger Corman's film The Haunted Palace (1963), which is also based on a Lovecraft story.

Critical response

G. Noel Gross, writing for the DVD review website DVD Talk, writes: "The plodding plot would be more painful if the flick were longer, but the intriguing meld of gothic horror and contemporary sci-fi is hard to pass up".

Comic book adaptation
 Dell Movie Classic: Die, Monster, Die! (March 1966)

See also
 List of American films of 1965

Notes

References

Sources

External links
 
 
 
 
 

1965 films
1965 horror films
1960s monster movies
1960s science fiction horror films
American monster movies
American science fiction horror films
British horror films
British monster movies
Cthulhu Mythos films
1960s English-language films
Films adapted into comics
Films based on short fiction
Films based on works by H. P. Lovecraft
Films directed by Daniel Haller
Mad scientist films
1965 directorial debut films
1960s American films
1960s British films